The 15th Pan American Games were held in Rio de Janeiro, Brazil from 13 to 29 July 2007. Mexico participated with 400 athletes and 218 staff members (delegates, officials, medical and auxiliary staff).

Goals
Mexican athletes achieved the Mexican Olympic Committee goal for the National representation as they ended up placed at the 5th place in general medal count, same place obtained at the 14th Pan American Games.

Medals

Gold

Athletics
 María Romary Rifka – Women's high jump
 Ana Gabriela Guevara Espinoza – Women's 400m
 José David Galván – Men's 10000m

Boxing
 Carlos Cuadras Quiroa – Men's bantamweight 54 kg

Canoeing
  José Cristóbal Quirino – Men's C1 1000m and 500 categories.
  Manuel Cortina and Jesús Valdez – Men's K2 1000m and 500m categories.
 Manuel Cortina – Men's K1 500m

Diving
  Paola Espinosa – Women's 10m platform and 3m springboard categories.
 Paola Espinosa and Laura Sánchez – Women's 3m synch springboard

Judo
 Vanessa Zambotti – Women's over 78 kg

Squash
  Erick Gálvez – Men's individual.

Taekwondo
 Alejandra Gaal – Women's up to 49 kg
 Iridia Salazar – Women's from 49 to 57 kg
 María del Rosario Espinoza – Women's above 67 kg

Weightlifting
 Carolina Valencia – Women's up to 48 kg category (First Gold medal for Mexico at the 2007 Pan American Games).

Silver

Athletics
 Dulce María Rodríguez de la Cruz – Women's 10,000m
  Juan Luis Barrios – Men's 5000m and 1500m categories.
 Horacio Nava – Men's 50 km walk
 Giovanni Lanaro – Men's pole vault
 Talis Apud – Women's 3000m steeplechase
 Ana Gabriela Guevara Espinoza, Gabriela E. Medina,  Zudykey Rodríguez and María Teresa Rugeiro  – Women's 4x400m relay

Archery
 Aida Román – Women's individual.

Canoeing
 José Cristóbal Quirino and Gilberto Soriano – Men's C2 500m

Cycling
 Alexandra Giuseppina Grassi – Women's individual pursuit
 Belem Guerrero Méndez – Women's road race

Diving
 Paola Espinosa and Tatiana Ortiz Galicia – Women's 10m synch platform
 Laura Sánchez – Women's 3m springboard
 Rommel Pacheco – Men's 10m platform

Rhythmic gymnastics
 Cynthia Yazmin Valdez Pérez – Women's individual all-around
 Ruth Castillo Galindo – Women's individual apparatus, hoop

Karate
 Bertha Gutiérrez – Women's under 60 kg

Rowing
 Analicia Ramírez and Lila Pérez – Women's lightweight double sculls

Sailing
 Tania Elías Calles Wolf – Women's one person dinghy, laser radial

Swimming
  Patricia Midori Castañeda Miyamoto – Women's 400m and 800m freestyle categories.

Weightlifting
 Cinthya Domínguez – Women's up to 69 kg
 Damaris Aguirre – Women's up to 75 kg

Bronze

Archery
 Jorge Chapoy, Juan René Serrano and Eduardo Vélez – Men's team

Athletics
 María Esther Sánchez – Women's 20 km walk
 Alejandro Suárez – Men's 10000m
 Nora Leticia Rocha – Women's 5000m
 Omar Cepeda de León –  Men's 50 km walk
 Procopio Franco – Men's marathon.

Baseball
 Mexican and Nicaraguan men's national teams, Bronze medal in Baseball, the game was cancelled due to rain, and the Organizing Committee decided to award the medal to both teams.

Beach Volleyball
 Bibiana Candelas and Mayra García – Women's beach volleyball.

Boxing
 Braulio Ávila Juárez – Men's fly 51 kg

Bowling
 Sandra Góngora and Adriana Pérez – Women's doubles.

Canoeing
 Anca Ionela Mateescu – Women's K1 500m

Cycling
 Laura Lorenza Morfin Macouzet – Women's mountain bike
 Belem Guerrero Méndez – women's points race

Football
 Mexico men's national team.

Rhythmic gymnastics
 Ruth Castillo Galindo – Women's individual all-around
   Cynthia Yasmín Valdez Pérez – Women's individual apparatus, rope, clubs and ribbon categories.
 Blajaith Aguilar Rojas, Sofía Díaz de León Lastras, Marienne Montserrat Martínez Medina, Ana Cristina Ortega Benítez, Citlaly Quinta Álvarez and Sara Elizabeth Reyes Rodríguez – Women's all-around

Sailing
 David Mier y Terán – Men's Windsurfer, Neil Pryde RS:X
 Andrés Akle Carranza and Jorge Xavier Murrieta – Men's double-handed dinghy, snipe

Shooting
 José Roberto Elías Orozco – Men's 10m air rifle
 Alix Moncada – Women's 10m air rifle
 Ariel Mauricio Flores Gómez – Men's skeet

Squash
 Samantha Terán – Women's Squash.
 Samantha Terán, Karina Herrera Zúñiga and Nayelly Hernández – Women's team
 Erick Gálvez, Jorge Baltazar and Marcos Méndez – Men's team

Swimming
 Juan Veloz – Men's 200m butterfly

Taekwondo
 José Luis Ramírez – Men's from 68 to 80 kg

Tennis
 Santiago González and Víctor Romero – Men's team

Wrestling
 Oscar Aguilar – Men's Greco-Roman 96 kg

Revoked medals

Artistic gymnastics
 The Pan American Games Organizing Committee decided to revoke the Bronze medal obtained by the Mexican Women's gymnastics team (Marisela Arizmendi Torres, Maricela Cantú Mata, Yesenia Estrada Martínez, Érika Mariene García Aguiñaga, Elsa García Rodríguez Blancas and Yeny Ibarra Valdez); Marisela Arizmendi Torres had an accreditation as an official ("As" accreditation) instead of being registered as an athlete ("Ao" accreditation), therefore the PASO Executive Committee decided to revoke the bronze medal and award it to the Canadian Women's team, who came up as 4th during the competition.

Results by event

Basketball

Women's Team Competition
Team Roster
Jennifer Arriola
Veronica Carmona
Alejandra Delgado
Abril Selene García
Erika Gomez
Fernanda Gutierrez
Lourdes Machuca
Taine Ramírez
Sandra Ramos
Zazil Salman
Brisa Silva
Melendez Villavicencio

Triathlon

Men's Competition
Arturo Garza
 1:53:43.51 – 9th place
Leonardo Saucedo
 1:56:26.50 – 18th place
Javier Rosas Sierra
 1:56:49.99 – 19th place

Women's Competition
Melody Angel Ramírez
 2:00:44.24 – 5th place
Adriana Corona
 2:01:00.46 – 7th place
Dunia Gómez Tirado
 2:04:20.30 – 15th place

See also
Mexico at the 2008 Summer Olympics
Events at the 2007 Pan American Games

References

External links
Pan American Games Rio 2007 Games Official site.
Comité Olímpico Mexicano, Mexican Olympic Committee official website (Spanish).

Nations at the 2007 Pan American Games
P
2007